The 2014 Maui Invitational Tournament was an early-season college basketball tournament that was played, for the 31st time, from November 14 to November 26, 2014.  The tournament began in 1984, and was part of the 2014–15 NCAA Division I men's basketball season.  The Championship Round was played at the Lahaina Civic Center in Maui, Hawaii from November 24 to 26.

Brackets 
* – Denotes overtime period

Opening round
The opening round was played on November 14–18 at various sites around the country.

November 14
Purdue 80, Samford 40 in West Lafayette, Indiana
San Diego State 79, Cal State Northridge 58 in San Diego, California
UMKC 69, Missouri 61 in Columbia, Missouri

November 16
Pittsburgh 63, Samford 56 in Pittsburgh, Pennsylvania
Arizona 86, Cal State Northridge 68 in Tucson, Arizona

November 17
Kansas State 83, UMKC 73 in Manhattan, Kansas

November 18
BYU 91, Arkansas-Little Rock 62 in Provo, Utah (BYUtv)

Regional round

*Games played at Jack Stephens Center in Little Rock, Arkansas

Championship round
The Championship round occurred from November 24–26 at Lahaina Civic Center in Maui, Hawaii.

References

Maui Invitational Tournament
Maui Invitational
Maui